The 2008 Crystal Skate of Romania was the 9th edition of an annual senior-level international figure skating competition held in Romania. It was held between November 13 and 15, 2008 in Galați. Skaters competed in the disciplines of men's singles and ladies' singles.

Results

Men

Ladies

External links
 results

Crystal Skate Of Romania, 2008